Club Deportivo San Sebastian  is a Salvadoran professional football club based in San Sebastián Salitrillo, Santa Ana, El Salvador.

The club currently plays in the Tercera Division de Fútbol Salvadoreño. 

The club was founded in TBD.

Honours
 TBD

Captain
 TBD (2016)

Notable players

List of Coaches
  Mario Salguero

References

External links
  

Nuevo San Sebastian